Jacobus is a borough in York County, Pennsylvania. A suburb of York, the population was 1,829 at the time of the 2020 census.

History
Founded in 1837, Jacobus was originally called "New Paradise". The name was later changed because of misdelivered mail between New Paradise and the town of Paradise, Pennsylvania, in neighboring Lancaster County.

The name "Jacobus" was derived from the name of the town's postmaster, Jacob Geiselman (1829–1909). To correct the problem of the misdelivered mail, the United States Post Office Department notified Geiselman to change the name of the post office. However, Geiselman was unable to think of another name. Therefore, the mail was sorted and forwarded to Geiselman labeled as,"Jacob-US Mail;" which was later shortened to "Jacob-US." The post office was then renamed Jacobus, and the town was renamed accordingly. In 1929, Jacobus became an incorporated borough under Pennsylvania law.

Geography
Jacobus is located at  (39.882516, -76.712068).

Demographics

As of the census of 2000, there were 1,203 people, 481 households, and 379 families living in the borough. The population density was 1,316.0 people per square mile (510.4/km2). There were 500 housing units at an average density of 547.0/mi2 (212.1/km2). The racial makeup of the borough was 99.42% White, 0.25% Native American, 0.17% Asian, and 0.17% from two or more races. Hispanic or Latino of any race were 0.25% of the population.

There were 481 households, out of which 31.0% had children under the age of 18 living with them, 68.0% were married couples living together, 7.9% had a female householder with no husband present, and 21.2% were non-families. 19.3% of all households were made up of individuals, and 9.6% had someone living alone who was 65 years of age or older. The average household size was 2.49 and the average family size was 2.84.

In the borough the population was spread out, with 22.3% under the age of 18, 4.8% from 18 to 24, 28.2% from 25 to 44, 28.1% from 45 to 64, and 16.6% who were 65 years of age or older. The median age was 42 years. For every 100 females there were 94.3 males. For every 100 females age 18 and over, there were 90.4 males.

The median income for a household in the borough was $44,185, and the median income for a family was $52,500. Males had a median income of $35,903 versus $25,139 for females. The per capita income for the borough was $23,224. None of the families and 1.3% of the population were living below the poverty line, including no under eighteen and 1.7% of those over 64.

References

Populated places established in 1929
Boroughs in York County, Pennsylvania